Municipal elections were held in Toronto, Ontario, Canada, on January 1, 1946. Incumbent Robert Hood Saunders ran unopposed and was acclaimed as mayor.

Toronto mayor
Results
Robert Hood Saunders - acclaimed

Board of Control
One incumbent on the Board of Control lost, William J. Wadsworth. He was defeated by Alderman Bert McKellar. Communist Stewart Smith of the Labor-Progressive Party won the second position on the Board.

Results
Hiram E. McCallum (incumbent) - 42,126
Stewart Smith (incumbent) - 41,637
David Balfour (incumbent) - 40,632
Kenneth Bert McKellar - 35,627
William J. Wadsworth (incumbent) - 35,477
Leslie Saunders - 22,040
Harry Bradley - 6,796

City council

Ward 1 (Riverdale)
William Murdoch (incumbent) - 5,597
Charles Walton (incumbent)  - 4,168
William Simpson - 3,481

Ward 2 (Cabbagetown and Rosedale)
Louis Shannon (incumbent) - 4,118
May Birchard - 3,014
George A. Wilson (incumbent)  - 2,910
William Dennison - 2,472

Ward 3 (West Downtown and Summerhill)
John S. Simmons (incumbent) - 2,175
Allan Lamport - 1,911
Harold Fishleigh (incumbent) - 1,724
Earl Selkirk - 586
William Smith - 285
Karl Prager - 281

Ward 4 (The Annex, Kensington Market and Garment District)
Nathan Phillips (incumbent) - acclaimed
Norman Freed (incumbent) - acclaimed

Ward 5 (Trinity-Bellwoods)
Arthur Frost (incumbent) - acclaimed
Charles Sims (incumbent) - acclaimed

Ward 6 (Davenport and Parkdale)
Harold Timmins (incumbent) - 6,768
Dewar Ferguson - 5,510
William V. Muir - 3,960
William Clifton - 3,744
Harold Lock - 2,244
Patrick McKeown - 746
Charles Dymond - 362

Ward 7 (West Toronto Junction)
William Butt - 4,510
E.C. Roelofson (incumbent) - 4,220
Eva Sanderson - 2,157

Ward 8 (The Beaches)
William Collings (incumbent) - 6,789
Walter Howell (incumbent) - 6,476
Murray Cotterill - 5,143
James Davis - 2,244

Ward 9 (North Toronto)
John Innes (incumbent) - 11,092
Melville Wilson (incumbent) - 8,257
F.W. Rayfield - 2,950
R.M. McLean - 1,720
Fred Vacher - 1,623

Results taken from the January 2, 1946 Globe and Mail and might not exactly match final tallies.

References
Election Coverage. Globe and Mail. January 2, 1946

Toronto
1946
1946 in Ontario
January 1946 events in North America